Rockland Community College (RCC) is a public community college in the town of Ramapo, New York in Rockland County. It is part of the State University of New York. The college, established in 1959, became the 18th community college to join the SUNY system. The college offers 51 programs and offers associate degrees and certificates.  Additionally, students can earn other degrees, including Bachelor of Arts, Bachelor of Science, and Master of Arts in the arts and sciences, Doctoral Program in Executive Leadership (EdD), technology, and health professions while attending classes at Rockland through articulation programs with four-year schools. The current enrollment is 6,859 students.

The main campus is in Suffern, New York, but classes are also offered at an extension sites in Haverstraw, Nyack and Orangeburg.  The Spring Valley satellite campus, sold for $4.2 million, has been discontinued. It was located in the historic North Main Street School. Instructions were discontinued at the Haverstraw Extension Center in 2020.

The college has more than 525 full and part-time faculty members, including several Fulbright Scholars, SUNY Chancellor's Award winners, and published authors and artists. The faculty-student ratio is 22:1. Rockland has the third highest transfer rate in the SUNY system and has a Continuing Education programs which served about 3,500 each year.

History
An institution called Rockland College, chartered by the state Board of Regents in 1878, existed for sixteen years in Nyack, New York.

Rockland Junior College, supported by federal funds disbursed through New York State, and sponsored by Nyack High School was established in 1932 as one of several depression-era two-year schools. New York University and Syracuse University accepted two years of credit from the college. Rockland Junior College shut down in 1935.

Rockland Community College came eighteen years and later was organized to be an affordable, two-year college in location convenient for county residents; it was planned that it would raise taxes by only $4 a year.  At the time, Rockland County, the state's smallest in geographic area outside of New York City, was growing exponentially in population and in demand for a skilled, educated work force.  Between 1956 and 1970, Rockland's population was one of the fastest growing in the state, expected to double from 107,000 to 215,000 and the number of high school graduates was projected to rise from 700 to 2,463.

Large local industries like Avon Products in Suffern and Lederle Laboratories in Pearl River required more skilled workers, and the growth of Rockland County hospitals, Nyack Hospital and Good Samaritan Hospital in Suffern warranted the creation of a nursing program.

Sixty-nine percent of parents polled expressed interest in their children attending a community college in Rockland County, and 183 high school juniors indicated a strong interest in and an ability to attend a community college in Rockland County.

In 2020, According to the United States Census Bureau, Rockland County, the thirteenth largest county in the State of New York population is 338,329,
Rockland County 65 public schools population is estimated at 40,000 students which includes 22,000 attending the 10 public high schools which currently has a graduation rate of 87%.

Presidents

Frank Mosher, 1960-1963
Seymour Eskow, 1963-1983
F. Thomas Clark, 1983-1992
Neil A Raisman, 1993-1997
George Hamada, 1998-2001
Thomas G. Voss, 2001-2003 (Interim President)
William J. Murabito, 2003-2004 (Interim President)
Clifford L. Wood, 2004–2017
Michael A Baston 2017
Susan Deer (Officer In Charge)

Veterans
On October 3, 2013, the United States Department of Veterans Affairs hosted the first induction of RCC students who are veterans into SALUTE - Veterans National Honors Society. SALUTE, established in 2008 is headquartered out of Colorado State University has over 90 chapters in colleges and universities across the country. RCC is the first community college to have a chapter of this organization.

Past Events
In the 1970, concerts and big-ticket events were held in the Eugene Levy Field house. Several major artist included, Billy Joel, Earth, Wind & Fire, Genesis, Meat Loaf, Styx and The Monkees.

Campus
The main campus and main entrance on Almshouse Road is located on the crest of a sloping rise in a former farm community known as Mechanicsville, renamed Viola when a post office was established in 1882. The original property included:

A wooden barn that was converted into a theater and assembly room in the second semester.
Fields leased to local farmers that yielded tomatoes and cabbage.  The college later acquired  of farmland—100 to the south from the Hurschle Brothers Farm, and 50 to the west from the Springsteen Farm—for its current  campus. The barn was used for registration, physical education classes, sports team practices, large classes and final exams, dance classes, student-faculty talent shows, worship services, films, guest lecture series, concert series, even war protest rallies.  It also served as the College Barn Theater. The Barn burned in January 1979; in 1983 it was replaced by the Cultural Arts Center.
A "potter's field" cemetery, the burial grounds for many of the Almshouse residents. Shortly after the college was founded, the county deeded a tract of land in the northern section for establishing a veterans' cemetery, which remains today.
A small square building with barred windows that served as the first Rockland County jail, later the Ramapo town police headquarters, and still later a police radio station.  It was converted into offices and men's locker rooms for the physical education program in the second semester.
A narrow, tree-lined country lane known as Almshouse Road, which became an interior access road when the current College Road was built.
The three-story, colonial design Almshouse.  In front of the Almshouse is a wooden gazebo that still stands.

Gary Onderdonk Rockland Veterans Cemetery
A cemetery was established on the property for almshouse residents, and shortly after the property was designated for the college's campus, the county designated a tract to serve as a veterans cemetery.  The Korean War Monument is large granite rock at the Gary Onderdonk Rockland Veterans Cemetery on Rockland Community College's campus with a plaque bearing the names of all 27 Rocklanders killed in action during the Korean War, with the inscription: "They gave their today for your tomorrow."

Organization
RCC is sponsored by the County of Rockland and operating and administered by a ten-member Rockland Community College Board of Trustees that is appointed pursuant to New York State Education Law § 6306. Nine of the Trustees serve seven-year terms, with five of those appointed by the county and four by the Governor.  The tenth trustee is a voting, student representative. The board in turn appoints a President who hires and supervises the staff.  RCC is a community college unit of the State University of New York and is also subject to regulation and visitation by the Regents of the University of the State of New York.

Accreditation
The college is accredited by the Middle States Commission on Higher Education. Some specific programs are also programatically accredited:

Accreditation Commission for Education in Nursing, Inc (ACEN), formerly National League for Nursing Accrediting Commission, Inc. (NLNAC).
American Occupational Therapy Association Accreditation Council for Occupational Therapy Education
New York State Board of Regents, State Education Department, Office of the Professions (Nursing Education)

Academics
Rockland Community College offers 40 associate degrees and 11 one-year certificate programs. It also partners with other institutions to provide students with pathways to some bachelor's and master's degrees. Like most community colleges, it also provides continuing education and life skills courses.

In 2017 Rockland Community College was ranked the best community college in New York for adult learners in Washington Monthly's recent annual ranking of American colleges and universities. Rockland Community College rated twenty-eighth nationwide out of nearly 1,500 two-year colleges. The following year, the college was name the fifth Campus Pride's 2018 Best of the Best LGBTQ-Friendly Colleges & Universities

In 2021, Rockland Community College received the Insight into Diversity Higher Education Excellence in Diversity (HEED) Award

High School Program
The Rockland Community College High School Program began in 2010.  Rockland Community College academic departments have oversight of the curriculum, textbooks, and student assessments offered at the high schools.  High school teachers who are college adjuncts teach the courses at the high schools.  Rockland Community College participates in the New York Concurrent Enrollment Partnerships (NYCEP), which enables the college to network and share strategies of concurrent enrollment programs offered throughout SUNY community colleges.

Cambridge University Study Abroad Program

Students must be at least 18 years of age and meet the requirement of a minimum 3.0 GPA and two faculty recommendations when classes begin at Cambridge University in July or August. Students can be from any college but must apply through the RCC Sam Draper M/TS Honors Program Office in Spring to be eligible.

Maritime Studies Program
Rockland Community College offers the nation's first Maritime Studies Program works with a US Coast Guard-approved partner featuring online training with hands-on classroom instruction at the college's campuses. Through the RCC/Learn America program, Mariners seeking work on board any vessel are required to complete a Coast Guard-approved Basic Training course. Students also are able to sign up for any of the individual elements of the Basic Training course.

Campus life

The Connection Center
In 2016 Rockland Community College opened The 211 Connection Center which connects students to off-campus resources regarding health and human services such as housing, childcare, food, utilities and legal because "life happens".

Athletics
The Rockland Hawks compete in the Mid Hudson Conference and belong to Region XV of the National Junior College Athletic Association. Many RCC alumni advance to competing at National Collegiate Athletic Association (NCAA) or National Association of Intercollegiate Athletics (NAIA) sponsored colleges or universities and several have gone on to professional sports careers as players, coaches, scouts and trainers.

Sports facilities
Baseball games were played at the Village of Suffern ball field
Basketball – The School used court time in gymnasiums at Suffern, Haverstraw, and Spring Valley high schools and a few junior highs.
Bowling at Hi-Tor Lanes in West Haverstraw, NY.
Calisthenics, jogging, archery, soccer, and Golf were held in the fields surrounding the small, peaked-roof building of the former Ramapo police station which housed the physical education office.
Fencing, gymnastics and varsity wrestling practice were held at the Barn.
Swimming and lifesaving were taught at the Bader's Hotel outdoor pool in Spring Valley.
Deer Kill Day Camp in Suffern was rented to teach lifetime skill sports like tennis, handball, and one wall paddleball as well as softball and basketball.
Eugene Levy athletic facility, known as the Fieldhouse was completed in 1972.

Sports championships
February 2007 – RCC Fighting Hawks Men's Bowling Team won their first Region XV Championship in school history. RCC made up three of the six All-Region members.
February 2009 – RCC Fighting Hawks Men's Basketball Team beat Sullivan County Community College Generals 81 – 77 to win the Region XV DIII Men's Championship.
May 2011 – RCC Golf Team Wins Region XV Championship winning by a four-stroke margin over Nassau Community College.
2013 - Region XV Division II Baseball Champions NJCAA
2013 - Region XV Tournament Runner-up Women's Basketball Championship
2015 - Region XV Women's Singles Tennis Champion - Rockland Community College Elina Arakelyan
 Elina qualified for NJCAA Division III National Championships, October 22–24 in Peachtree City, Georgia. Finished second. She and teammate Brooke Strieter also qualified to compete in the doubles tournament.
2016 - Region XV Division III Runner-up Men's Basketball Championship
2016 - Region XV Title - Men's Tennis Team Champions
2017 - Region XV Women's Mid-Hudson Championship Volleyball Conference Title
2018 - Region XV Men Golf Tournament Team Wins Third Place & three players; John Barna, Sean McGarvey and Anthony Mottolese qualified for Nationals hosted by Jamestown Community College at Chautauqua Golf Club in Chautauqua, New York.
2018 Head Athletic Trainer of the Year for Community Colleges Nationwide - Diana Carey
2019 - Region XV Baseball - The Hawks won a School record of 26 games in a row and was the first team to go undefeated in regular season play finishing 19–0.
2021 - Northeast District B Champions - Lady Hawks Volleyball

New York Boulders
Rockland Community College was the training camp site in 2011 for the Rockland Boulders (now the New York Boulders of the Frontier League) during the construction of their ballpark, Clover Stadium in Pomona, New York.

Notable faculty

Edmund W. Gordon, education scholar
Dan Masterson, poet

Notable alumni 
 David Carlucci, New York's 38th State Senate district - January 1, 2011 – December 31, 2020.
 Abel Ferrara, film director best known for Bad Lieutenant and King of New York.
 Bruce Kreutzer, assistant coach for the Orlando Magic of the National Basketball Association (NBA) and former RCC basketball player.
Thomas P. Morahan (1931 - 2010), New York's 38th State Senate district - May 1999 – July 12, 2010, New York State Assembly 96th district - January 1981 – December 1982.
 Michael Salzhauer, AKA Dr. Miami, best known for being a celebrity plastic surgeon.

References

External links

 Official website

Educational institutions established in 1959
Leadership in Energy and Environmental Design certified buildings
SUNY community colleges
Two-year colleges in the United States
Universities and colleges in Rockland County, New York
NJCAA athletics
1959 establishments in New York (state)